In economics, a privileged group is one possible condition for the production of public goods.

A privileged group contains at least one individual that benefits more from a public good than its production costs. Therefore, the good will be produced although other members of the group benefit without paying. However, this free rider problem may still result in an undersupply of the good compared to the Lindahl equilibrium.

Resources

See also
 Public good (economics)
 Collective action

Public economics